Mike Mazurki (December 25, 1907 – December 9, 1990) was a Ukrainian-American actor and professional wrestler who appeared in more than 142 films. His 6 ft 5 in (196 cm) presence and face had him typecast as often brainless athletes, tough guys, thugs, and gangsters. His roles included Splitface in Dick Tracy (1945), Yusuf in Sinbad the Sailor (1947), and Clon in It's About Time (1966–1967). Mazurki is also the founder and first President of the Cauliflower Alley Club.

Early years
Mazurki was born Markiyan Yulianovich Mazurkevich in the village of Kupchyntsi (in present-day Ternopil Raion), near what was then Tarnopol, Galicia, Austria-Hungary (now Ternopil, Ukraine). 

Mazurki attended LaSalle Institute in Troy, for high school. Upon finishing school, he changed his name to "Mike". He played football and basketball at Manhattan College, where he graduated with a Bachelor of Arts degree in 1930.

After earning his bachelor's degree, Mazurki graduated from Fordham Law School and became an attorney. He later said he took up professional wrestling because he could earn around ten times what he could as a lawyer. Mazurki was also a professional American football and basketball player.

Career 
Trained as a professional wrestler he turned to acting after serving as Mae West's bodyguard. Mazurki was discovered by Josef von Sternberg and given a bit part in his film The Shanghai Gesture (1941). This led to a long film and television career. Possibly his best-known role was as the slow-witted but dangerously obsessed thug Moose Malloy in the lurid film noir Murder, My Sweet (1944). He portrayed the psychotic, knife-wielding murderer Splitface in the original Dick Tracy (1945). (Mazurki would play a cameo role, 45 years later, in the 1990 Warren Beatty film version of the same name.) He played a wrestler nicknamed "The Strangler" in Night and the City (1950) and a role imitating the manner of a George Raft henchman in the Billy Wilder comedy, Some Like It Hot (1959). He continued to wrestle during his acting career. His slurred speech was reportedly due to a wrestling injury to his Adam's apple.

In addition to his film work, Mazurki made guest appearances on many popular television shows, among them My Friend Flicka (as a wrestler facing Gene Evans's character "Rob McLaughlin"), The Untouchables, Bachelor Father, Daniel Boone, Gilligan's Island, The Munsters, I Dream of Jeannie, Bonanza, and Gunsmoke, to name just a few. In 1964, he played Cully Barstow, a yacht hand, in "The Case of the Missing Button", an episode of Perry Mason in which he threatened Mason and Paul Drake with a set of brass knuckles. He also played Arthur Jacks in the episode "The Case of the Deadly Verdict" (1963). He was a regular as well on the short-lived sitcom The Chicago Teddy Bears. In 1966–67, he performed as the caveman "Clon" in It's About Time.

In 1972, he landed his only starring role in a film as Trapper in Challenge to Be Free. As he aged, acting opportunities for Mazurki began to slow in the 1970s and 1980s; nevertheless, he continued working until his death on December 9, 1990. His final film role, that of "Don Taglianeti", is in the low-budget comedy Mob Boss, which was released just two months before he died. Along with his film and television appearances, Mazurki was seen in the hit Rod Stewart music video "Infatuation", playing the bodyguard protecting a woman (played by Kay Lenz) from a stalker (played by Stewart). In the end, he succeeds, punching out Stewart.

Filmography

Belle of the Nineties (1934) as New Orleans Audience Admirer (uncredited)
Black Fury (1935) as Security Force Applicant (uncredited)
Each Dawn I Die (1939) as fellow prisoner (uncredited)
The Last Alarm (1940) as Onlooker (uncredited)
The Shanghai Gesture (1941) as The Coolie
Dr. Renault's Secret (1942) as Rogell (uncredited)
The Moon and Sixpence (1942) as Tough Bill (uncredited)
That Other Woman (1942) as Thug (uncredited)
Gentleman Jim (1942) as Jake Kilrain (uncredited)
It Ain't Hay (1943) as Bouncer (uncredited)
Prairie Chickens (1943) as Henchman Charlie (uncredited)
Taxi, Mister (1943) as Henchman Joe
Mission to Moscow (1943) as Russian Machinist Workman (uncredited)
Bomber's Moon (1943) as Kurt (scenes deleted)
Behind the Rising Sun (1943) as Japanese Wrestler (uncredited)
Thank Your Lucky Stars (1943) as Olaf (uncredited)
Swing Fever (1943) as Wrestler (uncredited)
Henry Aldrich Haunts a House (1943) as The Goon (uncredited)
Whistling in Brooklyn (1943) as Henchman on Ship (uncredited)
Lost Angel (1943) as Fighter (uncredited)
Shine On, Harvest Moon (1944) as Bouncer (uncredited)
Summer Storm (1944) as Tall Policeman Bending Over Petroff (uncredited)
The Canterville Ghost (1944) as Metropolus
The Missing Juror (1944) as Cullie — Masseur (uncredited)
The Princess and the Pirate (1944) as Pirate (uncredited)
Murder, My Sweet (1944) as Moose Malloy
The Horn Blows at Midnight (1945) as Bass Player / Humphrey Rafferty
The Spanish Main (1945) as Erik Swaine
Abbott and Costello in Hollywood (1945) as Klondike Pete
Dick Tracy (1945) as 'Splitface'
Dakota (1945) as "Bigtree' Collins
The Thin Man Goes Home (1945) as First Man outside barber shop (uncredited)
Live Wires (1946) as Patsy 'Pat' Clark
Mysterious Intruder (1946) as Harry Pontos
The French Key (1946) as Sam Cragg
Sinbad the Sailor (1947) as Yusuf
Killer Dill (1947) as Little Joe
Unconquered (1947) as Bone
Nightmare Alley (1947) as Bruno
I Walk Alone (1948) as Dan
Relentless (1948) as Jake
The Noose Hangs High (1948) as Chuck
Neptune's Daughter (1949) as Mac Mozolla
Come to the Stable (1949) as Sam
Rope of Sand (1949) as Pierson
The Devil's Henchman (1949) as Rhino
Abandoned (1949) as Hoppe
Samson and Delilah (1949) as Leader of Philistine soldiers
Night and the City (1950) as The Strangler
Dark City (1950) as Sidney Winant
He's a Cockeyed Wonder (1950) as 'Lunk' Boxwell
Pier 23 (1951) as Ape Danowski
Criminal Lawyer (1951) as 'Moose' Hendricks
Ten Tall Men (1951) as Roshko
The Light Touch (1951) as Charles
My Favorite Spy (1951) as Monkara
The Egyptian (1954) as Foreman, House of Death (uncredited)
New York Confidential (1955) as Arnie Wendler
New Orleans Uncensored (1955) as Big Mike
Blood Alley (1955) as Big Han
Davy Crockett: King of the Wild Frontier (1955) as Bigfoot Mason
Davy Crockett and the River Pirates (1956) as Bigfoot Mason
Kismet (1955) as Chief Policeman
Comanche (1956) as Flat Mouth
Around the World in 80 Days (1956) as Hong Kong Drunk
Man in the Vault (1956) as Louie
Hell Ship Mutiny (1957) as Ross
The Man Who Died Twice (1958) as Rak
The Buccaneer (1958) as Tarsus
Some Like It Hot (1959) as Spats's henchman #1
Alias Jesse James (1959) as Dirty Dog Tough (uncredited)
The Facts of Life (1960) as First Husband in Motel Room
Swingin' Along (1961) as Bookie
The Errand Boy (1961) as Blonde 'Movie Siren'
Pocketful of Miracles (1961) as Big Mike
Zotz! (1962) as Igor
Five Weeks in a Balloon (1962) as Slave Captain
Donovan's Reef (1963) as Sgt. Monk Menkowicz
It's a Mad, Mad, Mad, Mad World (1963) as Miner bringing medicine to his wife
4 for Texas (1963) as Chad
Cheyenne Autumn (1964) as Senior First Sergeant Wichowski
The Disorderly Orderly (1964) as Moving Van Passenger (uncredited)
7 Women (1966) as Tunga Khan — Bandit Leader
The Adventures of Bullwhip Griffin (1967) as Mountain Ox
Which Way to the Front? (1970) as Rocky (uncredited)
The Centerfold Girls (1974) as The Caretaker
Challenge to Be Free (1975) as Trapper
Won Ton Ton, the Dog Who Saved Hollywood (1976) as Studio Guard
Paesano: A Voice in the Night (1977) as Bodyguard
The Magic of Lassie (1978) as Apollo
The One Man Jury (1978) as Kayo's Handler
Gas Pump Girls (1979) as Moiv
Alligator (1980) as Gatekeeper
The Man with Bogart's Face (1980) as Himself
...All the Marbles (1981) as Referee in Chicago (uncredited)
Doin' Time (1985) as Bruno
Amazon Women on the Moon (1987) as Dutch (segment "Reckless Youth")
Dick Tracy (1990) as Old Man at hotel
Mob Boss (1990) as Don Taglianeti (final film role)

Television

 My Friend Flicka — episode — The Old Champ (1956) as Hercules
 Have Gun – Will Travel — episode — Ella West (1958) as Breed
 Official Detective "The Policeman's Gun" (1958) as Banning
Have Gun – Will Travel — episode — Love's Young Dream (1960) as Power
Perry Mason — episode — The Case of the Counterfeit Crank (1961) as Cully Baxter
Have Gun – Will Travel — episode — Don't Shoot the Piano Player (1962) as Jo Jo
Perry Mason — episode — The Case of the Missing Button (1964) as Cully Barstow
Daniel Boone — episode — Lac Duquesne (1964) as Akasheta (uncredited)
The Munsters — episode — Knock Wood, Here Comes Charlie (1964) as Leo 'Knuckles' Kraus
Wagon Train — episode — The Duncan McIvor Story (1964) as Lance Corp. Otto Moller
Laredo — episode — Pride of the Rangers (1965) as Pvt. Percy Flower
Gilligan's Island — episode — Friendly Physician (1966) as Igor/Ginger Grant
It's About Time — TV series 1966 — 1967 — 26 episodes
Daniel Boone — episode — Gabriel (1966) as El Toro
F Troop — episode — Our Hero,What's His Name (1966) as Geronimo
Rango — episode — Diamonds Look Better Around Your Neck Than a Rope (1967) as Jake Downey
Batman — episode — The Wail of the Siren (1967) as Allegro
I Dream of Jeannie — episode — Jeannie and the Great Bank Robbery (1967) as Girard
The Beverly Hillbillies -The Great Tag-Team Match (1968) as Wrestler
Bonanza — episode — Stage Door Johnnies (1968) as Big Man
Bonanza — episode — Dead Wrong (1969) as Big Jack
Land of the Giants - episode - Giants, and All That Jazz (1969) as Loach (Season 2, Episode 6)
My Three Sons - episode - What Did You Do Today, Grandpa? (1969) as Hugo (Season 9, Episode 17)
Adam-12 — episode — Bank Robbery (1970) as Claude Terry (Season 2, Episode 24)
Gunsmoke — episode — Trafton (1971) as Whale
Mannix — episode — Days Beyond Recall (1971) as Kony
Kung Fu — episode — Superstition (1973) as Hannibal
The Rockford Files — episode — A Fast Count (1978) as Choo-Choo (uncredited)
Charlie's Angels — episode — Mother Angel (1978) as Robbins
Fantasy Island — episode — Naughty Marietta/The Winning Ticket (1983) as Swamp Rat
Fantasy Island — episode — Love Island/The Sisters (1983) as Ugh

References

Further reading

External links

 
 
 Mike Mazurki on Hollywood Archæology
 Mike Mazurki papers, Margaret Herrick Library, Academy of Motion Picture Arts and Sciences
 On the Record: Actor Mike Mazurki’s legend looms large

1907 births
1990 deaths
20th-century American male actors
American male film actors
American male professional wrestlers
American male television actors
American people of Ukrainian descent
Austro-Hungarian emigrants to the United States
Fordham University alumni
Manhattan College alumni
Male actors from New York City
People from Cohoes, New York
Professional Wrestling Hall of Fame and Museum
Stampede Wrestling alumni